The 1938 World Table Tennis Championships – Corbillon Cup (women's team) was the fifth edition of the women's team championship.  

Czechoslovakia won the gold medal after finishing with a perfect 9–0 match record.

Corbillon Cup final table

See also
List of World Table Tennis Championships medalists

References

-
1938 in women's table tennis